Tardelli is a surname that may refer to:

 Adriano Tardelli (1896–1945), Italian resistance activist during World War II
 Diego Tardelli (born 1985), Brazilian footballer
 Juninho Tardelli (born 1983), Brazilian footballer
 Marco Tardelli (born 1954), Italian footballer and coach

Italian-language surnames